The 2000 World Wrestling Championships were held in Sofia, Bulgaria from 1 to 3 September 2000.

Medal table

Team ranking

Medal summary

Women's freestyle

Participating nations
90 competitors from 24 nations participated.

 (1)
 (6)
 (6)
 (5)
 (3)
 (3)
 (1)
 (3)
 (5)
 (3)
 (1)
 (6)
 (2)
 (1)
 (4)
 (1)
 (6)
 (4)
 (4)
 (2)
 (6)
 (6)
 (6)
 (5)

See also
Wrestling at the 2000 Summer Olympics

References
Results summary
Complete results

External links
UWW Database

 
World Wrestling Championships
W
W
W
World Wrestling Championships